Photocorynus spiniceps is a species of anglerfish in the family Linophrynidae. It is in the monotypic genus Photocorynus.Photocorynus Spiniceps is an anglerfish which originates from the Philippines.

The known mature male individuals are 6.2–7.3 millimeters (0.25-0.3 inches), smaller than any other mature fish and vertebrate; the females, however, reach a significantly larger size of up to 50.5 millimeters (2 inches). (However, numerous fish species have both sexes reaching maturity below 20 millimeters (0.8 inches).)

Like most other deepsea anglerfishes, Photocorynus spiniceps lures its prey into striking range using a bioluminescent sac at the end of an illicium, the highly modified first ray of the dorsal fin, and swallows the prey whole with the help of a distending jaw and a similarly distending stomach. Its prey can sometimes be as big as their own bodies. The male spends its life fused to its much larger female counterpart, therefore effectively turning her into a hermaphrodite.It is important to note that the male has to bite the female in order to spend the rest of its life fused together. 
 While the female takes care of swimming and eating, the male, with a large proportion of its body consisting of testes, is charged with the task of aiding reproduction.

References

External links
Some records in the fish world

Linophrynidae
Fish of the Philippines
Deep sea fish
Taxa named by Charles Tate Regan
Fish described in 1925